The Social Code is a 1923 American silent drama film directed by Oscar Apfel and starring Viola Dana. It was produced and distributed by Metro Pictures. Dana's older sister, Edna Flugrath, also features in the film.

Cast

Preservation
With no prints of The Social Code located in any film archives, it is now a lost film.

References

External links

Lobby poster; daybill
Lobby card at www.gettyimages.com

1923 films
American silent feature films
Metro Pictures films
Films based on short fiction
Lost American films
Films directed by Oscar Apfel
1923 drama films
American black-and-white films
Silent American drama films
1923 lost films
Lost drama films
1920s American films